Miguel Ángel Rubio (born 20 August 1966) is a Spanish gymnast. He competed at the 1988 Summer Olympics and the 1992 Summer Olympics.

References

1966 births
Living people
Spanish male artistic gymnasts
Olympic gymnasts of Spain
Gymnasts at the 1988 Summer Olympics
Gymnasts at the 1992 Summer Olympics
Gymnasts from Barcelona